Veijo Erkki Vannesluoma (born 29 July 1958 in Helsinki) is a retired Finnish pole vaulter. He finished fourteenth at the 1983 World Championships. He became Finnish champion in 1983.

References

1958 births
Living people
Finnish male pole vaulters
Athletes from Helsinki